The three-spotted dwarf minnow (Boraras micros) is a species of ray-finned fish in the genus Boraras.

References 

Boraras
Taxa named by Maurice Kottelat
Fish described in 1993
Taxa named by Chavalit Vidthayanon